Dainik Janambhumi is an Indian Assamese-language daily newspaper. This newspaper is published by Janambhumi Group of Publications from Nehru Park, Tulsi Narayan Sarma Path, Jorhat. In 1947, Janambhumi Group of Publications was founded with the launch of the weekly newspaper Janambhumi, which is the oldest Assamese weekly. The Dainik Janmabhumi was first launched in 1972, the second and the third editions were launched from Guwahati and Tinsukia in 2004. The newspaper is now published simultaneously from Jorhat, Guwahati and Tinsukia.

See also
 Asomiya Pratidin
 Niyomiya Barta

References

External links 
 

Assamese-language newspapers
Newspapers published in Assam
1972 establishments in Assam
Publications established in 1972